Brookfield Center was a rural hamlet in the late 19th century in the Town of Brookfield in Waukesha County, Wisconsin, roughly four miles northwest of Elm Grove. There was a post office there at least as late as 1890, but does not appear in the 1891 Wisconsin Blue Book.

Notable people 

Charles Brown (Wisconsin politician), farmer and state legislator
George W. Brown (Wisconsin politician), state legislator
Chauncey Purple, state legislator

References 

Unincorporated communities in Waukesha County, Wisconsin
Ghost towns in Wisconsin